Helps may refer to:

Helping behavior
Helps, Rohit Singh, a community in the United States
Arthur Helps, an English writer
Josh Helps
Lisa Helps
Robert Helps
Francis Helps

Charles Helps